Brian Duffy  is a former New Zealand weightlifter from Canterbury. He won the bronze medal in the featherweight division representing his country at the 1974 British Commonwealth Games in Christchurch.

References

Year of birth missing (living people)
Living people
New Zealand male weightlifters
Sportspeople from Christchurch
Commonwealth Games bronze medallists for New Zealand
Weightlifters at the 1974 British Commonwealth Games
Commonwealth Games medallists in weightlifting
Medallists at the 1974 British Commonwealth Games